Doug Ford is the 26th and current premier of Ontario, Canada. He won a majority in the June 7, 2018 Ontario general election, as leader of the Progressive Conservative Party of Ontario, (CPC) caucus in the Legislative Assembly of Ontario and was sworn in as premier on June 29, 2018. He was re-elected with a increased majority in the June 2, 2022 Ontario general election.

Elections

2018 Ontario general election

Ford won the Progressive Conservative Party of Ontario leadership election on March 10, 2018. He represented Etobicoke North.

In the 2018 Ontario general election held on June 7, 2018, Ford won a majority government with 76 of the 124 seats in the legislature with approximately 56.67% of potential voters voting.

2022 Ontario general election

Ford led the Progressive Conservatives to another majority government in the 2022 provincial election. The PCs gained seven more seats than they had won in 2018.

Policies

Economic policy

In June 2019, Rod Phillips, who served as Minister of the Environment, Conservation and Parks, replaced Vic Fedeli as Ontario's finance minister. Andrea Khanjin was appointed as Parliamentary Assistant to the Minister of the Environment, Conservation and Parks in June 2018.

Starting in January 2019, those who are working full-time and earning less than #30,000 a year would pay no provincial income tax, in the new LIFT program but minimum wage would be frozen at $14 per hour. They eliminated 3 legislative offices including the Environmental Commissioner of Ontario (ECO), child and youth advocate and French language services commissioner positions. The surtax on the highest earning Ontarians that would have generated about $275 million in revenue, was cancelled. The proposed French language university was cancelled as were three university satellite campuses.

Fedeli served as minister until he was moved to economic development in June 2019 in a major cabinet shuffle. According to CTV News Queen's Park Bureau Chief, Colin D'Mello, Premier Ford removed Fedeli as Finance Minister on June 20, 2019 in the "wake of a disastrous budget rollout that's left the Progressive Conservative government drowning in negative publicity."

Minister Fedeli tabled the Ford government's first budget on April 11, 2019. According to the Sault Star, Fedeli was demoted from "highly-touted finance post" and "blamed" for the "failure to sell voters on the $163.4-billion budget and the cost of breaking a 10-year deal that ultimately expands beer and wine sales in grocery stores, costing taxpayers $1 billion." NDP Timiskaming-Cochrane MPP, John Vanthof, said that the 2019 budget failed northern Ontario by not providing funds for Highway 69, the Ring of Fire, expanded broadband access, and cuts to Indigenous Affairs, Ministry of Natural Resources, the Ministry of Agriculture, Food, and Rural Affairs, and more. Vanthof said that there "will be beer in corner stores, drinks at 9 in the morning, tailgate parties, and blue licence plates, but when the fog is cleared, there is also an over $500 million cut to the Ministry of Northern Development and Mines."

In the fiscal year 2019, the publicly funded Legal Aid Ontario will receive $133 million less than previously, representing a funding cut of 30 per cent, as part of the Ford government's deficit cutting plan, presented in the April 2019 budget. On September 11, 2019, Chief Justice of Ontario George Strathy said that the "cuts to Legal Aid Ontario will force many people to self-represent...What we judges can say is that reducing legal representation for the most vulnerable members of society does not save money. It increases trial times, places greater demands on public services, and ultimately delays and increases the cost of legal proceedings for everyone."

The deficit

From about 1989 to 2018, Ontario has reported a deficit almost every year; the province's net debt increased to approximately $311.6 billion (by October 2018); and Ontario's net debt‐to‐GDP ratio grew from 13.4% to about 40.5% in 2018–19.

According to an April 11, 2018 Royal Bank of Canada (RBC) report, which was based on figures provided by the Ford government, the revised estimate of Ontario's deficit was $11.7 billion in 2018-2019 and it was projected to decrease by  $1.4 billion in 2019-2020 mainly because of "the removal of the $1 billion contingency reserve." At that time it was projected that the deficit would be "completely eliminated in 2023-2024 with a small surplus of $0.3 billion." By October 2019, the Financial Accountability Officer, Weltman, said that the FAO had been in error when they—and the Ford government—had projected a $11.7-billion deficit that was reported in the spring 2019 budget.

By June 2018, Ontario had "Canada's second-highest public debt per person and a growing budget deficit", according to The Economist.

The Ontario Finance Department reported in October 2018, that Ontario's public debt per person at $23,014, had surpassed that of Quebec at $21,606 in the fiscal year 2017–2018.  Newfoundland and Labrador public debt per capita at $27,761, was the highest in Canada.

By 2019, the Ontario Chamber of Commerce reported that Ontario's debt was over $348 billion—representing about 41% of provincial GDP of almost $850 billion. Ontario's GDP is much larger than any of the other provinces and is almost half of Canada's GDP. "When combined with the federal debt (approximately $680 billion), the debt-to-GDP ratio for Ontarians nears 80 percent."

In October 2019, Financial Accountability Office said that the deficit had increased from $3.7-billion deficit in 2017—at the end of the Liberal administration—to $7.4 billion in 2018 under Premier Ford. The deficit had almost doubled partly because of "cancelled climate-change initiatives and subsidizing hydro bills" according to the Hamilton Spectator.

Economic Development and trade

Minister Smith tabled Bill 47: Making Ontario Open for Business Act, 2018, which was passed on November 21, 2018. According to the Toronto Sun, Bill 47 strips "part-time workers of two paid sick days a year and prevent[s] a rise in the minimum wage to $15 an hour on January 1, 2019." NDP critic said that this "will incent employers to turn full-time positions into cheaper part-time work".

The Ontario government abruptly cut all its provincial annual funding—representing $5 million—to the Ontario Institute for Regenerative Medicine (OIRM) in May 2019. Minister Smith, said that the "private sector will step up and fund stem-cell research." Scientists told CBC that the private will only invest in the stem-cell field when "their studies reach a late phase", until then "government funding is crucial." OIRM scientists who are "working on treatment of premature babies" said the cuts were "extremely short-sighted and uninformed".

In June 2019, Vic Fedeli was appointed as Minister of Economic Development, Job Creation and Trade. Prabmeet Sarkaria is Associate Minister of Small Business and Red Tape Reduction in the economic development ministry. Michael Parsa and Donna Skelly were appointed as Parliamentary Assistants to the Minister of Economic Development, Job Creation, and Trade (Trade) in June 2018.

Transportation

On April 10, 2019, Premier Ford and Minister Yurek announced Ontario's transit plan for the Greater Toronto Area (GTA)—one of the largest metropolitan areas in Canada. The $30 billion dollar project would include the $10.9 billion Ontario Line, the $5.5 billion Scarborough Subway Extension, the $5.6 billion Yonge Subway extension to Richmond Hill, and the $4.7 billion Eglinton West extension. The province would provide $11.2 billion in funding and "wants to own the lines but leave the city and TTC to operate the subway system." Premier Ford said, "We are making the biggest and largest investment in new subways in Canadian history." The City of Toronto had already spent $224 million of public money on its own "planning and design of transit infrastructure in Toronto." The City raised concerns about delays considering the city manager—Chris Murray's "sweeping" April 16 transit expansion report, "which also suggests several projects may now be in limbo, including two Scarborough transit lines and Mayor John Tory's signature SmartTrack plan." In a December 13, 2018, City Council meeting, Toronto Transit Commission (TTC) CEO Rick Leary, said that he had not had any "direct negotiations or discussion" with the province on what "it would look like if the province uploaded the subway system"—bringing the "TTC's subway system under provincial ownership". While there were clear financial benefits to the city, the council voted to "reaffirm their desire to keep the entire TTC — subways and all" and requested more clarity from the province. The studies and plans for the TTC's proposed "desperately needed extension known as the Relief Line", had begun in the late 2010s. By early 2019, the planning for the Relief Line was "well underway and construction was scheduled to begin in 2020, with projected completion in 2029." Ford and his "markedly different vision for transit in the GTA", presented in April, put the Relief Line project on hold.

Social services

On November 15, 2018 the government announced that they were eliminating three watchdog legislative offices including the child and youth advocate.

One of the biggest cuts, announced in the 2019 budget, was the $1 billion cut—over a four-year period—to the Ministry of Community and Social Services.

In February, 2019 the government had announced changes to the Ontario Autism Program, which had over 20,000 children on a waiting list. Under Minister MacLeod and Fee, changes were made in "how children qualified, based on age and family income". During the revamping of the Program, support for children already receiving service, was clawed back which meant that families had to pay most of the bills for "very expensive behavioural therapies." This "outraged those in the autism community". The protests included a "huge rally at Queen's Park that could be heard inside the legislature and inundated Tory MPPs and Social Services Minister Lisa MacLeod with complaints."  In response, the Ford government "scrambled to pour more money into the program and in early May [2019] announced consultations that would help shape further reforms to the system, moving toward one based on need." The Hamilton Spectator said that of all the "policy snafus", the funding of services for families of children with autism, was the one that bothered Ford the most.

On August 8, 2019 the Ford government severed the funding for court-ordered autism services for eight families with adult children with "severe" conditions who are at "serious risk of harm", who had been receiving the funding since 2004. Lawyers Scott Hutchison and Mary Eberts served notice of intent to sue in an 18-page letter to Social Services Minister Smith and Premier Ford "for breach of contract, negligence, and breach of Charter rights." It was formally filed in court on October 1. Those long-standing payments of about $1.7 million annually were the result of litigation against the previous provincial administrations, who had committed to continue the funding "until a co-ordinated transition to other services had been made, in a way that provided alternative services with which the families were satisfied", according to The Star. Faced with a backlash against "a botched revamp of autism services" in February 2019, the government had doubled the annual funding to $600 million for autism services but this did not restore the funding for these eight families.

Healthcare

In July 2018, Premier Ford named Rueben Devlin, an orthopedic surgeon who was CEO of Toronto's Humber River Hospital and a "key Tory adviser"and former Ontario PCs president—to a $348,000 a year three-year appointment on the Council on Improving Healthcare and Ending Hallway Medicine, to curb hospital overcrowding. Devlin is the Ford family's "closest health-care adviser." Health costs in Ontario were over $60 billion annually, according to TVO's Steve Paikin. Devlin is tasked with the selection of the other Council members, and with "ending hallway medicine, dental care for seniors, improved mental-health services), all while ensuring stable, long-term funding for the system—Premier Ford's election promises.

Since coming into power in June 2018, Premier Ford's government put an approved injection site in Toronto—and several other places—on pause while the new Ontario Health Minister, Christine Elliot, studied the issue.

In February 2019, the NDP said that two sets of leaked documents show that the Ford government was creating a health "super agency" that "would be in charge of managing health services, quality improvement, patient relations, digital health and tissue donation and transplants, among other responsibilities." The documents said that "long-term care inspections" and the Ontario's  "air ambulance service"  Ornge would be "outsourced". According to a CTV News report, Minister Elliot was "forced to make assurances" that these services would not be "privatized". The first document, which was leaked at the end of January, was a "draft version of the Progressive Conservative government's upcoming health-care transformation legislation." CTV News said "local health integration networks, Cancer Care Ontario, eHealth Ontario, the Trillium Gift of Life Network and other government health agencies" would be "rolled into" the super agency. Minister Elliot said that the December 13 assistant deputy ministers workshop document, which made references to outsourcing laboratories, "inspections, licensing, devices" and Ornge, were options and that these services would not be privatized. The NDP said that the super agency was described in the leaked documents as having the "competency and capacity to effectively partner with public and private sector entities." The documents show that MyCare groups is being created as a "new model" of "integrated care delivery" with the goal of providing "patients with seamless, co-ordinated care and a single team of providers for all their care needs."

Ontario Health Minister Christine Elliot tabled the controversial Bill 74: The People's Health Care Act. Its first reading was on February 26, 2019 and it received Royal Assent on April 18, 2019.

In spite of 2018 election promises that "not a single person will lose their job" under his PC government, Ontario Health Minister Christine Elliot office announced in June 2019 that 416 workers would be laid off, as 20 health agencies, including 14 local health integration networks (LHINs), Cancer Care Ontario, eHealth Ontario were merged into one new super-agency called Ontario Health. With the merger "another 409 vacant positions will be eliminated." These changes are estimated to save "$350 million a year by 2021-22". A CBC News report said that the average wait times in Ontario hospitals set a new June record of an average of 16.3 hours waiting in emergency rooms in 2019, compared to 14.4 hours in June 2018, based on Health Quality Ontario data. More restructuring was announced by the Health ministry in September and no more job losses are anticipated.

Education

In early July 2018, then Education Minister, Lisa Thompson, told Queen's Park reporters that starting in September 2018, Ontario schools would no longer be using the sex education curriculum in use since 2015, but would be reverting to the previous curriculum. One of the election campaign promises by the Ford government was to "scrap" the 2015 sex education curriculum. Premier Ford's government said that "it did not order the cancellation." By August 2019, the Ministry of Education, following "widespread consultations" made "only minor tweaks". The "health lesson plan being brought to schools in the fall" of 2019 "is similar to the one Ford crusaded against."

On October 11, 2019 Minister Lecce reached a deal with CUPE school support workers, which has to be ratified by CUPE members and averted a pending strike. Premier Ford had said that he would cap "all public sector wage settlements at one per cent per year". The three-year agreement with CUPE was for a "one per cent wage increase annually for the duration of deal." A clause in the agreement clause in the agreement says that if "higher increases are negotiated by other education unions", their union will be able to increase to more than one percent. CUPE also had $58.3 million restored for the "hiring of educational assistants" with an additional $20 million for hiring "more custodians and clerical workers." As well, CUPE's sick leave provisions remained untouched.

In August 2018, in response to "incidents on campuses across North America where speakers faced protests", then Minister Fullerton announced that all "publicly-assisted" colleges and universities were required to "develop and publicly post its own free speech policy by January 1, 2019". The policy must meet a "minimum standard specified by the government." These standards must include the Chicago principles. Higher Education Quality Council of Ontario (HEQCO) has the authority to gather the mandatory self-reporting by colleges and universities and to monitor colleges and institutions on compliance. An article in The Hamilton Spectator cited examples of protests against controversial speakers in Ontario, such as Jordan Peterson, a University of Toronto professor and Lindsay Shepherd, who was disciplined after showing a Peterson video to her students at Wilfrid Laurier University. Fullerton said that free speech had become a campaign issue. She said the government was "constantly" hearing from students and faculty "that free speech was being stifled on Ontario campuses."

Francophone Affairs

Mulroney voted in support of the Ford government's September 2018 proposal to use Section 33 of the Canadian Charter of Rights and Freedoms, commonly called the "notwithstanding clause", to overrule a judge's decision that legislation intended to shrink the size of Toronto City Council was in fact in violation of Charter rights. For this position, she faced widespread condemnation from constitutional experts and politicians of all parties, particularly with respect to her duty to ensure the sanctity of the judicial process as Attorney General.

In November 2018 Ford announced cuts which included cancelling a "French language university and cut the post of provincial commissioner for French language affairs." Ontario's francophone population represents from 550,000 to 744,000 people in a province of 14 million, according to The New York Times with many concentrated in Sudbury, Ontario, in northern Ontario and near the Ontario-Quebec border in eastern Ontario.

The Ford government again came under criticism from the Franco-Ontarian community for its perceived inaction during the 2021 Laurentian University Financial Crisis and its support of the large cuts to the university.

Indigenous Affairs

In the April 2019 budget, funding for the Ministry of Indigenous Affairs was cut in half.

Minister Rickford released a May 9, 2019 statement saying that the Ontario Government was "committed to do everything in its authority to support the relocation" of the Kashechewan First Nation. which is located north of Fort Albany, Ontario on the James Bay coast. The community has had flooding and infrastructure problems for many years and in April 2019, had to evacuate 2,500 members by plane when a state of emergency was called again. APTN reported, in the presence of 300 community members, both the federal and provincial governments signed the Framework Agreement with Kashechewan First Nation to commit to moving the reserve. The federal Minister of Indigenous Services Seamus O'Regan said the relocation process would probably take about eight years to complete.

Northern Development and Mines

A July 7, 2018 article in Policy Options said that newly elected Premier Ford, had said that "resource development within northern Ontario's Ring of Fire mining area [would] be a priority for his government."

In Verner, Ontario on September 17, 2019, Premier Ford told the press that the development of the Ring of Fire development "remains a top priority for the Progressive Conservative government." In August, Greg Rickford, who is Ontario's Minister of Energy, Northern Development and Mines (MENDM), said that the Ford government was dissolving the 2014 regional framework agreement between the nine Matawa First Nations and the province. By September, Rickford said that they were working with individual communities on a transportation corridor that Rickford called a "corridor to prosperity" from the Ring of Fire—Ring of Fire as a "major economic opportunity"—to transportation hubs in the south.

However, the 2019 budget cut more than $500 million to the Ministry of Northern Development and Mines.

Energy

In July 2018 Minister Rickford tabled Bill 2: Urgent Priorities Act, which received Royal Assent in the same month. The first session of the 42nd Legislature was on July 11 and Bill 2, which passed into law on July 25, was the Ford Government's first piece of legislation.  Bill 2—an omnibus bill—was "criticized by both "business groups and unions". It legislated an end to the strike between York University and Canadian Union of Public Employees (CUPE), cancelled the White Pines Wind Project wind farm contract, and gave Ontario government "veto power over compensation at Hydro One."

Hydro One

On July 25, 2018, the Ford government passed Bill 2 which "put a severe dent into the operations of Hydro One", a former Crown corporation which went public in November 2015. The Toronto-based Hydro One is the province's "largest electricity transmission and distribution service provider" with "nearly 1.4 million customers". Hydro One was established under the Business Corporations Act Crown corporation under the Government of Ontario. Bill 2 places a cap on the compensation allowed for executive members of the board of directors, and gave Ford's provincial government a "direct say in the naming of directors" representing a major shift from what was agreed upon between shareholders and the government when Hydro One went public three years earlier. Under Premier Ford, the CEO and the entire board of directors were replaced. The former CEO, Mayo Schmidt was replaced by Tim Hodgson, a Ford appointee, who took on his new position in August 2019 with an annual salary of $120,000. Hydro One was in the process of acquiring American energy firm Avista Inc., when "U.S. regulators scuttled" the purchase "costing the Toronto-based company a $140 million termination penalty." The Washington Utilities and Transportation Commission said that they blocked the purchase of Avista because of concerns about the independence of Hydro One from the Ontario provincial government. Reducing Ontario consumer electricity costs by 12% was one of the campaign promises made by the Conservative party. government had promised to cut consumers' electricity prices 12%. By July 2019, this has not happened, according to The Record. Critics raised concerns that Hydro One will not experience stability as Premier Ford's government has a "record of reaching in to exert control."

On March 21, 2019 Minister Rickford, tabled Bill 87, the Fixing the Hydro Mess Act which was given Royal Assent on May 9. Bill 87 overhauled the Ontario Energy Board and eliminated the Liberal's 2017 Fair Hydro Plan which the PC's said would save $442 million. The Liberal Plan "subsidized electricity with borrowed money" in response to a "public outcry over soaring hydro rates, particularly in rural areas." The Liberals created the Ontario Power Generation Inc (OPG Trust) as the Financial Services Manager to manage the debt. Bonnie Lysyk, the Auditor General released a special report on October 17, 2017, which said the "structure of the plan" was in violation of the provincial government's accounting rules. She said that the Plan, which committed the government to discount consumer electricity rates for ten years, would cost the province "$21 billion in interest over the next 30 years." The 2017 AG report said that it would cost $4 billion more on the $18.4 billion loan to use the Ontario Power Generation (OPG Trust) than if the province took out the loan because the province would have a lower interest rate than the OPG Trust. The Ford government said that they would maintain [the] 25 per cent time-of-use rates, that was part of the Liberal's Fair Hydro Plan. Under the newly structured Conservative plan, the debt financing "would move onto the government's books" from the OPG trust.

Provincial–municipal relations

In September 2018, Ford announced that he would use the Canadian Charter of Rights and Freedoms' "notwithstanding" clause to override the ruling of a Superior Court judge which said that Ford's legislation, decreasing the size of Toronto City Council just before the municipal election, was unconstitutional. As Ontario's AG, Mulroney voted in support of the Ford government's use of Section 33 of the Canadian Charter of Rights and Freedoms. According to the Globe and Mail, "constitutional experts and politicians of all parties" criticized her decision as a violation of the sanctity of the judicial process as Attorney General.

In October 2020, the Ford government passed the Supporting Ontario’s Recovery Act, 2020, which including a section that banned municipalities in the province from using ranked ballots for their mayoral and city council elections. The move came as multiple cities in the province were planning to switch from first-past-the-post to ranked ballots for the 2022 local elections.

Toronto City Council 

The Ford government passed the Better Local Government Act into law on August 14, 2018. Premier Ford announced the controversial bill on September 27, on the last day for candidate registration for the October 22, 2018 Toronto municipal election, newly elected Premier of Ontario Doug Ford introduced the Better Local Government Act (Bill 5) which requires that Toronto use the same ridings for all its elections—municipal, provincial, and federal—effectively reducing the Toronto City Council from 47 seats to 25. Bill 5 passed on August 14, 2018. Toronto is Ontario's capital city and the largest city in Canada with a population of 2.7 million. The number of Council seats had just been expanded following approximately four years of consultations and debates. Ford said that these reductions would lower the cost to taxpayers by $CDN 25 ($USD19.1) million dollars in Toronto's $CDN11.1 ($USD8.5) billion dollar budget. Bill 5 reset the positions of regional municipality chairs as by appointment not be election in Peel, York, Niagara and Muskoka.

Housing

Bill 23, More Homes Built Faster Act, 2022
Minister Clark introduced Bill 23, More Homes Built Faster Act, 2022, an omnibus bill intended to increase Ontario's housing supply that was described as "one of Premier Ford's "largest pieces of legislation" to date. Bill 23 would make sweeping changes affecting nine laws and "every aspect of planning and development" in the province. By November 25, Ford announced a rollback of some of Bill 23's most controversial changes to existing statutes that would have undermined environmental concerns.

Environment

On June 7 after winning the election, Ford said that "very first item" on his agenda would be to cancel the federal carbon tax and provincial cap-and-trade programs in order to prevent motorists from being "gouged at the pumps".

According to a June 28, 2018 article in The Economist, Ontario, with "Canada's second-highest public debt per person and a growing budget deficit", Fords' "poleaxing of cap and trade" would result in C$2.8bn worth of pollution permits owned by companies that could result in lawsuits. The article said that Ontario would lose C$2bn a year from the sale of pollution permits under its cap and trade program, which represents 1.3% of Ontario's revenue.

In November 2018, the Ford government announced that it was eliminating three provincial watchdog groups including the Environmental Commissioner of Ontario (ECO) to cut costs. Then Environmental Commissioner of Ontario (ECO), Dianne Saxe, had just submitted her 4-volume 339 page 2018 Environmental Protection Report, entitled "Back to Basics, to the Legislative Assembly of Ontario. Saxe was a "vocal critic" of the Ford government's "actions on climate change"—"their vow to fight a federal carbon tax, pulling out of more than 700 renewable energy contracts and moving to end the Ontario Green Energy Act."

Bill 57, also known as the Restoring Trust, Transparency and Accountability Act transferred the Environmental Commissioner Officer's duties to the Auditor General of Ontario.

Ford's government withdrew the province from the Western Climate Initiative emissions trading system, which had been implemented by the previous Liberal government.

Infrastructure

As Minister, McNaughton introduced Bill 32, the Access to Natural Gas Act in the fall of 2018. It was passed into law that December. Bill 32 was intended to make it possible to expand access to natural gas expand access to natural gas throughout rural and Northern Ontario including to First Nations communities.

Premier Ford said in a statement released on September 17, 2018 that "cancelling the cap-and-trade carbon tax" had caused the price of natural gas to decrease in Ontario. Premier Ford announced the new legislation and explained how it differed from the previous government's 2017 taxpayer-funded $100 million Natural Gas Grant Program—through which—according to Premier Ford, "private sector companies were limited from participating in natural gas expansion, portions of which were instead managed by the [Natural Gas Grant Program]."  Bill 32, The Access to Natural Gas Act passed into law in 2018, to "encourage more private gas distributors to partner with communities to develop projects that expand access to affordable and efficient natural gas."

On September 18, 2018, the city of North Bay learned that the Natural Gas Grant Program funding of over $8.6 million had been cancelled for a natural gas project that would have extended "services to as many as 350 homes in the north shore area of Trout Lake."

In January 2019, Minister McNaughton announced that the Ford government would provide $27 million to Northeast Midstream towards the construction of their Nipigon LNG gas plant. The plant would be capable of converting natural gas into a liquid form, that can be trucked to consumers. The project will create between 700 and 2,800 jobs in the region.

In May 2019, Minister McNaughton announced that the Ontario's Government "committed up to $63.7 million" to Southwestern Integrated Fibre Technology (SWIFT) with support from other levels of government. The not-for-profit, publicly-funded SWIFT project to develop a regional fibre optic network, has been one of the key initiatives of the Western Ontario Wardens' Caucus (WOWC) representing upper-tier municipalities in southern Ontario from Dufferin to Windsor. Through SWIFT, federal, provincial and local municipalities "subsidize the construction of an open-access, high-speed broadband network in Southwestern Ontario, Caledon and the Niagara Region."

COVID-19 pandemic

Initial outbreak 
In December 2019, an outbreak of coronavirus disease 2019 (COVID-19) was first identified in Wuhan, Hubei, China; it spread worldwide and was recognized as a pandemic by the World Health Organization (WHO) on March 11, 2020. The first confirmed case in Canada was in Ontario—reported on January 27, 2020.

On March 17, Ford declared a state of emergency in Ontario, closing bars and restaurants (with the exception of take-out and delivery services), as well as libraries, theatres, cinemas, schools and daycares and all public gatherings of more than 50 people (later reduced to 5 people on March 28). Furthermore, the government announced on March 17 that Ontario had "some evidence of community transmission" of COVID-19.

On March 23, Ford announced that all "non-essential" businesses be ordered closed starting 11:59 p.m. On March 24. Ford also stated that schools would remain closed past the original April 6 opening date (on May 19 it was announced that schools would remain closed until the following school year in September). A list of 74 "essential" businesses was published later in the day on March 23.

On March 25, Ford and Finance Minister Rod Phillips introduced a $17-billion response package that includes an influx of cash for the health sector, direct payments to parents and tax breaks for businesses.

Third wave 
On April 9, 2021, Ford received his first dose of the AstraZeneca COVID-19 vaccine at a local pharmacy in Toronto, and encouraged eligible Ontarians to get vaccinated.

Amid growing case numbers in mid-2021, the government moved to introduce a third province-wide stay at home order. As part of the response, Ford announced on April 16, 2021, that outdoor amenities including playgrounds would be closed, and that he would be authorizing police to require pedestrians and drivers to explain why they are not at home and provide their home address and other relevant details. The regulations raised concerns about a re-legalization of carding. The government experienced significant backlash with the new enforcement measures, with some commentators – such as the National Post's Randall Denley, a former PC politician – equating the province to a "police state" Members of the Ontario COVID-19 Science Table described the new restrictions as "absolute madness", and not based on science questioning the need to restrict "safe options from people as you do nothing to impact the places where the disease is spreading". After dozens of police services across the province announced that they would refuse to enforce the new measures, Ford promptly rolled back the new enforcement provisions the next day and reopened playgrounds, while keeping other outdoor amenities closed.

Over the weekend following the introduction of new orders, calls for Ford's resignation over his handling of the COVID-19 crisis grew, In April 2021, Ford revealed that he had been in isolation following contact with one of his staffers, who had contracted COVID-19. Ford announced on April 30, 2021, that he had asked the federal government to stop international students from coming into the province in an effort to curb the third wave.

Omicron variant 
During the emergence of the Omicron variant of COVID-19 in December 2021 and January 2022, Ford's government announced in December 2021 new restrictions on indoor settings. After growing calls for third or booster doses of COVID-19 vaccines, the government allowed all Ontarians over 18 years of age to receive a third dose on December 20, 2021.

On January 3, 2022, Ford announced that Ontario would be moving into modified Step 2 on January 5, closing indoor dining, gyms, movie theatres and schools.

References

External links
 Premier of Ontario Official Site

Premiers of Ontario
Ford, Doug